, provisional designation , is a sub-kilometer sized asteroid and temporary quasi-satellite of Venus. It was the first such object to be discovered around a major planet in the Solar System. In a frame of reference rotating with Venus, it appears to travel around it during one Venerean year but it actually orbits the Sun, not Venus.

Discovery, orbit and physical properties 

It was discovered on 11 November 2002 at Lowell Observatory. As of February 2013,  has been observed telescopically 457 times with a data-arc span of 2,947 days and it was the target of Doppler observations in 5 occasions; therefore, its orbit is very well determined. Its semi-major axis of 0.7237 AU is very similar to that of Venus but its eccentricity is rather large (0.4104) and its orbital inclination is also significant (9.0060°). The spectrum of  implies that it is an X-type asteroid and hence an albedo of about 0.25 should be assumed. The body is calculated to measure 236 meters in diameter. Its rotational period is 13.5 hours and its light curve has an amplitude of 0.9 mag which hints at a very elongated body, perhaps a contact binary.

Quasi-satellite dynamical state and orbital evolution 

The existence of retrograde satellites or quasi-satellites was first considered by J. Jackson in 1913 but none was discovered until almost 100 years later.  was the first quasi-satellite to be discovered, in 2002, although it was not immediately recognized as such.  was identified as a quasi-satellite of Venus by Seppo Mikkola, Ramon Brasser, Paul A. Wiegert and Kimmo Innanen in 2004, two years after the actual discovery of the object. From the perspective of a hypothetical observer in a frame of reference rotating with Venus, it appears to travel around the planet during one Venusian year although it does not orbit Venus but the Sun like any other asteroid. As quasi-satellite, this minor body is trapped in a 1:1 mean-motion resonance with Venus. Besides being a Venus co-orbital, this Aten asteroid is also a Mercury grazer and an Earth crosser.  exhibits resonant (or near-resonant) behavior with Mercury, Venus and Earth. It seems to have been co-orbital with Venus for only the last 7,000 years, and is destined to be ejected from this orbital arrangement about 500 years from now. During this time, its distance to Venus has been and will remain larger than about 0.2 AU (3·107 km).

Potentially hazardous asteroid 

 is included in the Minor Planet Center list of Potentially Hazardous Asteroids (PHAs) because it comes relatively frequently to within 0.05 AU of Earth. Approaches as close as 0.04 AU occur with a periodicity of 8 years due to its near 8:13 resonance with Earth.  was discovered during the close approaches of 11 November 2002. During the last close encounter on 7 November 2010,  approached Earth within 0.035 AU (13.6 Lunar distances), brightening below 15th magnitude. Numerical simulations indicate that an actual collision with Earth during the next 10,000 years is not likely, although dangerously close approaches to about 0.002 AU are possible, a distance potentially within Earth's Hill sphere.

Numbering and naming 

This minor planet was numbered by the Minor Planet Center on 18 May 2019. As of 2020, it has not been named.

See also

References

Further reading
 Retrograde satellite orbits, by Jackson, J. 1913, Monthly Notices of the Royal Astronomical Society, Vol. 74, pp. 62–82.
 Understanding the Distribution of Near-Earth Asteroids Bottke, W. F., Jedicke, R., Morbidelli, A., Petit, J.-M., Gladman, B. 2000, Science, Vol. 288, Issue 5474, pp. 2190–2194.
 A Numerical Survey of Transient Co-orbitals of the Terrestrial Planets Christou, A. A. 2000, Icarus, Vol. 144, Issue 1, pp. 1–20.   
 Debiased Orbital and Absolute Magnitude Distribution of the Near-Earth Objects Bottke, W. F., Morbidelli, A., Jedicke, R., Petit, J.-M., Levison, H. F., Michel, P., Metcalfe, T. S. 2002, Icarus, Vol. 156, Issue 2, pp. 399–433.
 Asteroid 2002 VE68, a quasi-satellite of Venus, by Mikkola, S., Brasser, R., Wiegert, P., & Innanen, K. 2004, Monthly Notices of the Royal Astronomical Society, Vol. 351, Issue 3, pp. L63-L65.
 Transient co-orbital asteroids Brasser, R., Innanen, K. A., Connors, M., Veillet, C., Wiegert, P., Mikkola, S., Chodas, P. W. 2004, Icarus, Vol. 171, Issue 1, pp. 102–109. 
 The population of Near Earth Asteroids in coorbital motion with Venus Morais, M. H. M., Morbidelli, A. 2006, Icarus, Vol. 185, Issue 1, pp. 29–38. 
 On the dynamical evolution of 2002 VE68, by de la Fuente Marcos, Carlos; & de la Fuente Marcos, Raúl (2012), Monthly Notices of the Royal Astronomical Society, Vol. 427, Issue 1, pp. 728–739.
 Asteroid 2012 XE133: a transient companion to Venus de la Fuente Marcos, Carlos; de la Fuente Marcos, Raúl (2013), Monthly Notices of the Royal Astronomical Society, Vol. 432, Issue 2, pp. 886–893.

External links 
 List Of Aten Minor Planets, Minor Planet Center
 List of Potentially Hazardous Asteroids (PHAs)
 Image acquired during the last 2002 VE68 close approach, 7 November 2010 (Martin Mobberley's Astronomical Images web site) 
 Light curve (Ondřejov NEO Photometric Program)
 2002 VE68 Goldstone Radar Observations
 
 
 

Aten asteroids
Discoveries by LONEOS
Venus co-orbital minor planets
Potentially hazardous asteroids
Venus-crossing asteroids
Earth-crossing asteroids
20021111